Phacellini is a tribe of longhorn beetles of the subfamily Lamiinae.

Taxonomy
 Brachychilus
 Eurycallinus
 Neobrachychilus
 Phacellus
 Piola
 Scolochilus
 Tuberopeplus

References

Phacellini
Beetle tribes